Inhumas Esporte Clube is a football club in the city of Inhumas, in the state of Goiás that competes in the second division of Campeonato Goiano.

History
Founded on June 13, 1939, in the city of Inhumas in the state of Goiás, the club is affiliated to Federação Goiana de Futebol and has played in Campeonato Goiano (First Division) seventeen times, Campeonato Goiano (Second Division) five times and Third Division eight times.

References 

Football clubs in Goiás